
Gmina Kargowa is an urban-rural gmina (administrative district) in Zielona Góra County, Lubusz Voivodeship, in western Poland.

Villages
Apart from the town of Kargowa, Gmina Kargowa contains the villages and settlements of Chwalim, Dąbrówka, Kaliska, Karszyn, Nowy Jaromierz, Obra Dolna, Przeszkoda, Smolno Małe, Smolno Wielkie, Stary Jaromierz, Szarki and Wojnowo.

Neighbouring gminas
Gmina Kargowa is bordered by the gminas of Babimost, Bojadła, Kolsko, Siedlec, Sulechów, Trzebiechów and Wolsztyn.

Twin towns – sister cities

Gmina Kargowa is twinned with:
 Schulzendorf, Germany

References

Kargowa
Zielona Góra County